IT 8-bit was a computer museum in Mariupol, Ukraine. It was founded by Dmitry Cherepanov. Before its destruction it used to be one of the largest privately owned computer museums in Ukraine. It was opened in August 2016. 

The museum contained many computers from the Soviet Union.

The building housing the museum, which contained more than 500 exhibits, was destroyed during the Siege of Mariupol in the 2022 Russian invasion of Ukraine.

References

External links
 Official website

2003 establishments in Ukraine
2022 disestablishments in Ukraine
Attacks on museums
Buildings and structures destroyed during the 2022 Russian invasion of Ukraine
Computer museums
Computing in the Soviet Union
Defunct museums in Ukraine
Historiography of the Soviet Union
Museums established in 2003
Museums disestablished in 2022
Museums in Mariupol
Technology museums in Ukraine